Chajiang or Zhajiang  (渣江镇) is a town in Hengyang County, Hunan, China.

Towns of Hunan
Hengyang County